Wagon Limit (foaled May 16, 1994) is an American Thoroughbred racehorse who won the 1998 Jockey Club Gold Cup.

Career

Wagon Limit's first race was on February 22, 1997, where he came in 2nd place. On April 3, 1997, he captured his first win at Aqueduct Racetrack.

On April 4, 1998, he won the 1998 Westchester Handicap, his first graded race.

On October 10, 1998, in the final race of his career, he captured the Grade 1  Jockey Club Gold Cup.

Stud career
Wagon Limit's descendants include:

c = colt, f = filly

Pedigree

References

1994 racehorse births
Racehorses bred in Florida
Racehorses trained in the United States
Thoroughbred family A13